The 2018–19 Moldovan National Division season was the 28th in of the top basketball league in Moldova.

Basco were the defending champions.

Competition format
Six teams joined the regular season, played as a double-legged round-robin tournament. The four best qualified teams joined the playoffs, that would be played in a best-of-five format.

Teams

Regular season

League table

Results

Playoffs
All series were played in a best-of-five playoff format (2-2-1).

Bracket

Semi-finals

|}

Fifth place series

|}

Third place series

|}

Finals

|}

References

External links
Moldovan Basketball Federation
Moldovan league on Eurobasket

Moldovan
Basketball in Moldova